Ambros is a German name derived from Ambrosius and also the shortened form of Ambrosio in Spanish. All are equivalent to Ambrose in English. 

Spellings in other languages include }, and may refer to:

Given Name
 Ambrós, name for Miguel Ambrosio Zaragoza (1913–1992), distinguished comic strip cartoonist
 Ambros Martín (born 1968), Spanish former handball player and current coach
 Ambros Seelos (1935–2015), German composer, singer, arranger, conductor
 Ambros Sollid (1880–1973), Norwegian agronomist and politician.
 Ambros Speiser (1922–2003), Swiss engineer and scientist
 Ambros Uchtenhagen (1928-2022), Swiss psychiatrist

Surname
 August Wilhelm Ambros (1816–1876), Austrian composer and music historian of Czech descent
 Harald Ambros (born 1980), Austrian equestrian
 Krystyna Ambros (born 1961), Polish rower
 Michael Hermann Ambros (1750–1809), Austrian publisher and author of Cantastoria
 Otto Ambros (1901–1990), German chemist and Nazi war criminal
 Paul Ambros (1933–2015), German ice hockey player
 Tihana Ambroš (born 1980), Croatian handball player
 Victor Ambros (born 1953), American developmental biologist
 Vladimir Ambros (born 1993), Moldovan footballer
 Wolfgang Ambros (born 1952), Austrian songwriter and rock/pop singer

See also 
Equivalent given and surnames in other languages include:
 Ambro, a surname
 Ambrose (disambiguation), English
 Ambrus (disambiguation), Hungarian
 Ambrogio, Italian
 Ambroży, Polish
 Amvrosy, Russian
 Ambroz (disambiguation), Serbo-Croatian
 Ambróz (disambiguation), Slovakian
 Ambrož (disambiguation), Slovenian and Czech
 Ambrosio (disambiguation), Spanish